Naracoorte  may refer to:

Naracoorte, South Australia, a town and locality
Naracoorte Airport
Naracoorte Coastal Plain (biogeographic region)
Naracoorte woodlands, a WWF ecoregion - refer List of ecoregions in Australia
District Council of Naracoorte, a former local government area, now part of Naracoorte Lucindale Council

See also
Naracoorte Caves National Park
Naracoorte Caves Conservation Park
Naracoorte Caves Conservation Reserve
The Naracoorte Herald